Alex Dujshebaev Dobichebaeva (born 17 December 1992) is a Spanish handball player for Industria Kielce and the Spanish national team.

His mother is of Russian descent, and his father, Talant Dujshebaev who is a former handball player and current coach, is of Kyrgyz descent. His brother Daniel Dujshebaev is also a handball player.

Honours
RK Vardar
EHF Champions League: 2017
Macedonian Championship: 2015, 2016, 2017
Macedonian Cup: 2014, 2015, 2016, 2017
Liga SEHA: 2014, 2017

Vive Kielce
Polish Championship: 2018, 2019, 2020, 2021, 2022
Polish Cup: 2018, 2019, 2021

Individual awards
All-Star Right back of the World Championship: 2023

References

External links

RK Vardar profile

Spanish male handball players
Living people
1992 births
Sportspeople from Santander, Spain
Handball players from Cantabria
BM Ciudad Real players
Liga ASOBAL players
Spanish people of Kyrgyzstani descent
Spanish people of Russian descent
Expatriate handball players in Poland
BM Aragón players
Spanish expatriate sportspeople in Poland
Vive Kielce players
Spanish expatriate sportspeople in North Macedonia
RK Vardar players
Handball players at the 2020 Summer Olympics
Medalists at the 2020 Summer Olympics
Olympic bronze medalists for Spain
Olympic medalists in handball
21st-century Spanish people